Olbia Costa Smeralda Airport  is an airport in Olbia, Sardinia. It was the primary operating base for Italian airline Air Italy whose headquarters were located at the airport. It mostly handles seasonal holiday flights from destinations in Europe and is managed by Geasar S.p.A.

History

A military airfield was opened at Olbia (then Terranova Pausania) in 1921, and a seaplane base was inaugurated close to the Isola Bianca harbour in 1927, although poor loads from the island on the flights to Ostia and Cagliari led to the service's stop in Terranova being discontinued in 1929. The airfield and seaplane base were targeted by Allied bombing in World War II, and the Germans opened another airfield 4.5 miles west of the town, which was renamed Olbia in 1945.

Commercial flights gradually returned and in 1963, the Olbia-based airline Alisarda was formed. It successfully expanded its route network, introducing jet flights in 1972, and it was renamed Meridiana in 1991. However, the introduction of jet aircraft necessitated the building of a larger airport nearer the city; the current airport was completed in 1974.

Following three years of work, a new terminal covering 42,000 square metres and capable of handling 4.5 million passengers per year, was unveiled on 6 June 2004. Costing a total of €81 million, the structure was designed by Willem Brouwer Architects and incorporated the original terminal building, which was developed into a 3000-square metre retail area. The new building has 40 check-in desks and ten boarding gates, five of which are equipped with jet bridges. It contains a wide variety of shops and restaurants, a wine bar, a small art gallery, and indoor garden areas featuring local flora.

The airport also is home to the Tourist Management department of the University of Sassari.

From 3 February to 14 March 2020, the airport closed to passenger air traffic for the refurbishment and extension of the taxiways and runway. During this period, all flights arriving and departing were cancelled. The airport building remained in this period open to events of various kinds. The airport, which was initially scheduled to reopen on March 14, 2020, remained closed until June 2, as a result of the measures taken by the Italian authorities due to the COVID-19 pandemic. The airport reopened on June 3.

Airlines and destinations

The following airlines operate regular scheduled and charter flights to and from Olbia:

Statistics

Ground transportation

By car
The airport is connected to local motorways SS125 and SS729.

By bus

The following bus services operate to/from the airport.

Local buses

Local operator ASPO Olbia operates two routes to/from the airport:

2 Airport-Sa Minda Noa
10 Airport-Town Centre-Airport

Regional and long distance buses
514 Olbia-Olbia Airport-Siniscola-Nuoro
601 Santa Teresa di Gallura-Palau-Arzachena-San Pantaleo-Olbia-Olbia Airport
 Cala Gonone-Dorgali-Orosei-La Caletta-Olbia Airport
 Nuoro-Siniscola-Budoni-San Teodoro-Olbia Airport
20 Olbia Airport-Olbia-Porto Cervo-Baja Sardinia-Hotel Stelle Marine (Costa Smeralda Shuttle)
30 Olbia Airport-Olbia-Calangius-Castelsardo-Porto Torres
90 Alghero-Alghero Fertilia Airport-Sassari-Olbia Airport-Olbia
Olbia Airport-Olbia-Arzachena-Palau-Santa Teresa di Gallura
Olbia-Telti
Cagliari-Oristano-Abbasanta-Nuoro-Siniscola-San Teodoro-Olbia Airport-Olbia-Arzachena-Palau-Santa Teresa di Gallura

References

External links

 Official website
 

Airports in Sardinia
Airport